Waves is an album by American jazz saxophonist Sam Rivers featuring performances recorded in 1978 and released on the Tomato label.

Reception
The Allmusic review by Ron Wynn awarded the album 4 stars stating "An explosive late '70s set with underrated composer, multi-instrumentalist, and arranger Sam Rivers leading a strong quartet... Their array of contrasting voicings, with Rivers on tenor and soprano sax and flute, makes for compelling listening".

The authors of The Penguin Guide to Jazz called the album "a neglected masterpiece from one of the most interesting of Rivers's small groups," and wrote: "It's a shame this fine record hasn't had wider currency."

Track listing
All compositions by Sam Rivers
 "Shockwave" - 14:58 
 "Torch" - 7:05 
 "Pulse" - 10:33 
 "Flux" - 6:10 
 "Surge" - 5:18 
Recorded at Big Apple Studio in New York City on August 8, 1978

Personnel
Sam Rivers - tenor saxophone, soprano saxophone, flute, piano
Dave Holland - bass, cello
Joe Daley - tuba, baritone horn
Thurman Barker - drums, percussion

References

Tomato Records albums
Sam Rivers (jazz musician) albums
1978 albums